Lee Meyerhofer (born June 11, 1964) is a former member of the Wisconsin State Assembly for the 5th District.

Biography
Meyerhofer was born on June 11, 1964 in Kaukauna, Wisconsin. He graduated from Kaukauna High School and Fox Valley Technical College. Meyerhofer is married with two children.

Career
Meyerhofer was first elected to the Assembly for District 5 in 1998. In 2002, he was defeated for re-election by Becky Weber. He has also been a member of the Kaukauna City Council since 1992. Meyerhofer is a Democrat.

References

People from Kaukauna, Wisconsin
Democratic Party members of the Wisconsin State Assembly
Wisconsin city council members
1964 births
Living people